Lisa Lambert is a Canadian politician, who was elected to the Legislative Assembly of Saskatchewan in the 2016 provincial election, and re-elected in 2020.  She represents the electoral district of Saskatoon Churchill-Wildwood as a member of the Saskatchewan Party.

References

Living people
Saskatchewan Party MLAs
Women MLAs in Saskatchewan
Politicians from Saskatoon
21st-century Canadian politicians
21st-century Canadian women politicians
Year of birth missing (living people)